Sub-traditions, also known as Samparda (Gurmukhi: ਸੰਪਰਦਾ; saparadā) in the Punjabi language, are sub-traditions within Sikhism that believe in different approaches to practicing the religion. While all sampradas believe in Waheguru (God) and one creator, typically* reject idol worship or the caste system, different interpretations have emerged over time, some of which have a living teacher as the leader. The major historic traditions in Sikhism, states Harjot Oberoi, have included Udasi, Nirmala, Nanakpanthi, Khalsa, Sahajdhari, Namdhari Kuka, Nirankari and Sarvaria.
During the persecution of Sikhs by Mughals, several splinter groups emerged such as the Minas and Ramraiyas during the period between the death of Guru Har Krishan and the establishment of Guru Tegh Bahadur as the ninth Sikh Guru. These sects have had considerable differences. Some of these sects were financially and administratively supported by the Mughal Empire in the hopes of gaining a more favorable and compliant citizenry.

In the 19th century, Namdharis and Nirankaris sects were formed in Sikhism, seeking to reform and return to the Sikh faith to the "original ideology" of Sikhism. They also accepted the concept of living gurus. The Nirankari sect, though unorthodox, was influential in shaping the views of Khalsa and the contemporary era Sikh beliefs and practices. Another significant Sikh break off sect of the 19th century was the Radha Soami movement in Agra led by Shiv Dayal, who relocated it to Punjab. Other contemporary era Sikhs sects include the 3HO Sikhism, also referred to as Sikh Dharma Brotherhood formed in 1971 for establishing the Sikh faith in the western hemisphere. This was led by Singh Sahib Yogi Harbhajan Singh. See also Dera (organization), non-Sikh Deras, for more examples of Sikh sects.

Early Sikh sampardas

These distinguished ways or paths are termed ‘sampardaya’ or 'samprada'. This term has, in the past, been wrongly mis-interpreted or conveyed to the public as ‘sects’ or a ‘cults’, terms that incorrectly imply deviation, arising from dissent with practised beliefs. The term samparda does not mean ‘sect’, but rather order, as in an order of monks. In this sense a sampardaya represents one among several mutually complementary orders. Each one of the major traditional sampardas began with the Gurus.

Panj Samparda (Gurmukhi: ਪੰਜ ਸੰਪਰਦਾਵਾਂ; pañj sampradāvā̃; meaning "five sects") is the collective name for the following five early sampradayas in Sikhism.

These include: Nihang Samparda, Udasi Samparda, Nirmala Samparda, Sevapanthi Samparda, and Giani Samparda.

Some people also consider the Sikh school Damdami Taksaal as a separate samprada. They are known for having beliefs similar to the Nirmalas.

Udasi

Udasi derived from the Sanskrit word "Udasin", meaning "detached, journey", reflecting an approach to spiritual and temporal life, is an early sect based on the teachings of Guru Nanak's elder son Sri Chand (1494–1643), who, contrary to his father's emphasis on participation in society, propagated ascetic renunciation and celibacy. Another Sikh tradition links the Udasis to Baba Gurditta, the eldest son of Guru Hargobind, and there is dispute on whether the Udasis originated with Sri Chand or Gurditta.

They maintain their own parallel line of gurus from Guru Nanak, starting from Sri Chand followed by Gurditta. They first came to prominence in the 17th-century, and gradually began to manage Sikh shrines and establishments in the 18th century, from where they espoused a model of Sikhism that diverged considerably from that of the Khalsa. They would set up establishments across North India through to Benares, where they would come to be ideologically joined with monastic asceticism. The combination of Hindu gods and the Sikh religious text indicated that the sect evolved over time under many historical influences and conditions, interpreting the message of Guru Granth Sahib in monistic Vedantic terms. They were initially largely based in urban centers where they set up their establishments, or akharas, only beginning to spread into rural areas during Sikh rule.

According to 18th-century descriptions, they either cut or mat their hair under a turban, rather than knot it under a turban like Khalsas, and instead of the Khalsa emphasis on the panj kakkar garb and sporting arms, their dress code would include items such as a cap, a cotton bag, a flower rosary, a vessel made of dried pumpkin, a chain around the waist, ash to smear on their body, and a deerskin upon which to perform Hatha yoga, resulting in an extremely divergent appearance from Khalsa Sikhs in the eighteenth century. In addition to not considering the Khalsa's Rehat Maryada to be binding on them, their modes of thought and attitude towards salvation also differed significantly. The Khalsa believed that salvation could be attained while taking part in society and pursuing secular objectives like political power and accumulation of resources like agrarian land, though this had to be accomplished within a particular framework of beliefs and spiritual practices, chief among which was the societal order and structure of the Khalsa. The Udasis considered secular pursuits to be incompatible with personal salvation, which was to be achieved only through renouncing the world, espousing asceticism and a monastic traveler lifestyle. Udasis are known for their Akharas along with the Nirmala sect of Sikhism. It is important to note that many Udasis actually took Amrit, and have become members of the Khalsa.

During the era between the martyrdom of Banda Singh Bahadur in 1716 and the rise of Ranjit Singh and the Sikh Empire, they were among the few sects able to build and manage Gurdwaras and train apprentices; they were scholars in both Sanskrit and Persian. They were respected and patronized through land grants during Sikh rule. With a wide reach due to their attempt to synthesize Sikh tradition with Hindu ascetic orders they synchronized with, they were able to derive significant acceptance during the era of armed struggle in Punjab, bringing a large number of people into the Sikh fold during the 18th and the early 19th centuries. They greet each other with "Om namo Brahmane," and attribute their origin to the mythic Sanandan Kumar, the son of Brahma. When the Singh Sabha movement, dominated by Reformist Khalsa Sikhs, codified the Sikh identity in the early 20th century, the increasingly corrupt  and hereditary Udasi mahants were expelled from the Sikh shrines. After the standardization of Sikh identity after the Singh Sabha movement, the Udasis increasingly regarded themselves as Hindus rather than Sikhs.

Nirmala

Nirmalas are a Sikh tradition of ascetics. According to the traditional beliefs, the Nirmala Sikh tradition was founded by Guru Gobind Singh in late 17th century when he sent five Sikhs to Varanasi to learn Sanskrit and Hindu religious texts. Another tradition states that they originated during the time of Guru Nanak. These beliefs, according to W. H. McLeod, are of doubtful historicity because they are "scarcely mentioned" in Sikh literature before the 19th century.

The Nirmala Sikhs often wear ochre-colored robes (or at least one item) and observe celibacy, and keep kesh (unshorn hair). They observe the same birth and death rituals as the Hindu ascetics and have an akhara (martial organization) in Haridwar, and a number of deras in Punjab (India). They have been one of the procession participants in Kumbh Melas. They were itinerant missionaries who traveled and spread Sikhism among the masses beyond Punjab, and were particularly active in Malwa within Punjab through Patiala and Phulkian state patronage during the 19th century, thus making an important contribution to the growth of Sikhism. They created many books & writings which explained the some of the Sikh Scriptures, such as the famous Faridkot Teeka, which provides a complete exegesis of the Guru Granth Sahib, very similar to the Islamic tafsir. They often served as one of the mahants in Sikh temples (gurdwaras) during the 18th century. Nirmalas interpret the Sikh literature in Vedantic terms. During the Singh Sabha Movement of the late 19th century and early 20th century, some of their doctrines met with disapproval by the Tat Khalsa faction of Sikhs, though they continued to be accepted as Sikhs, and were cordially regarded by the Sanatan faction.

Sevapanthi 

The Sevapanthi (also known as Sewapanthi or Addanshahi) is a traditional samprada of the Sikhs. Sewapanthi is a compound word made up of the terms sewa, which means unselfish service, and panthi, panth, which in this case refers to the way, literally means "widened road." As a result, this phrase can be used to describe people who choose the route of unselfish service. They wrote many commentaries on Sikh texts, known as steeks or teekas, and wrote many books & gave many lectures explores Hindu schools of thought, as well as Sufi Mysticism, and famous Islamic writers such as Imam Al-Ghazali.

They emerged with Kanhaya Lal, a Dhamman (Dhiman) Khatri, a personal disciple of Guru Tegh Bahadur, was born in 1648 in the now-Pakistani town of Sohadara. Formerly a Mughal officer, he worked as a menial at the Guru's table day and night, bringing water to the horses and everyone else with him. He learned numerous Sikh spiritual principles from the Guru. In the rugged Attock district of Punjab's Northwest boundary, Bhai Kanhaiya built a Dharmsala (Rest house and shrine).  The 10th Guru, Guru Gobind Singh, exempted Khanaiya and his followers from military duty and told him to carry on performing the duty allotted him by his reverend Guru Tegh Bahadur of serving all living beings. In a latter battle in Anandpur, Bhai Khanaiya served water indiscriminately to friend and foe alike. For this act, some angry Sikh warriors accused him of treason and brought him before Guru Gobind Singh. When the Guru asked him why he was helping the wounded enemy, he replied that he could not distinguish between friend or foe as he could only see guru in all. The Guru was pleased, and he then blessed him, saying after him shall be a Sikh order who will serve all mankind indiscriminately. Noor Shah was amongst those Mughal soldiers to whom Bhai Khanaiya had served water and attended. He went onto become a great disciple of Bhai Khanaiya, setting up a Dharmsala of his own. Two of the most prominent followers were Seva Ram and Baba Adan Shah. As such, Sevapanthis are often referred to as Adan Shahi.

The Seva Panthis are pacifists & themselves desist from all forms of violence. Traditionally, the Sevapanthis were associated with the Sehajdharis, as evidenced by their names (Adan Shah, Seva Ram). They are strict pacifists, which is the reason they would forego Khande Ki Pahul. Many believed they were exempt from Pahul by Guru Gobind Singh. They are celibate and eat and share property together. Flesh, liquor and hemp are avoided & their dress is white. M.A Macauliffe described them as an orthodox and honourable sect who live by honest labour.

There are strong historical links between the Udasi and Sevapanthi sampardas. Very few sevapanthis exist today.

Akali/Nihang 
Main Article: Nihang
An armed Sikh warrior organization called the Nihangs or Akalis, which means "the immortals," was founded in the Indian subcontinent. Nihangs are thought to have come from Guru Hargobind's "Akali Sena" (lit. "Army of the Immortal") or Baba Fateh Singh from the dress he wore. The Nihangs dominated early Sikh military history and were renowned for their triumphs despite being vastly outnumbered. The Nihangs, who were originally the irregular guerrilla squads of the Sikh Khalsa Army, formed some parts of the armed forces of the Sikh Empire, and were historically renowned for their valor and cruelty on the battlefield. There are four main factions amongst the Nihangs of the modern-era, them namely being: The Budha Dal, Tarna Dal, Bhidi Chand Dal, and Ranghreta Dal. Nihang Samprada is also sometimes collectively called, Dal Khalsa.

The Budha Dal is the largest and most influential of all these 4 subsections. Some Nihang groups consume small amounts of crushed cannabis in a drink called shaheedi degh (ਭੰਗ), purportedly to help in meditation. Shaheedi Degh without cannabis is called Shardai. Its consists of nuts, herbs some flowers, and a slight amount of cannabis. Nihang Sikhs are also known for their practice of Jhatka.

Nihangs often consider themselves as Kshatriyas, and that the whole Khalsa is Kshatriya. The Nihang were particularly known for their high turbans (dastar bunga) and their extensive use of the chakram or war-quoit. Their turbans were often pointed at the top and outfitted with a chand torra or trident called gajga which could be used for stabbing in close-quarters. They also accept the Dasam and Sarbloh Granth scriptures as extensions of the Guru Granth Sahib. Currently, Dal Khalsa is the largest it has ever been in its entire history.

Taksali 

The Gyaaniyan (Giani) Samparda used to act as a bit of university for Sikhi. Whilst technically not an order, it essentially serves as one. Often made up from individuals belonging to all of the above sects. There are many branches within this order. People allege that Giani Samparda is just Sikhs from the institution known as Damdami Taksal.

Damdami Taksaal is a school said to have been created by the 10th Guru, Guru Gobind Singh. It still exists to this day and teaches thousands of people, all across the globe. In 1706, after the Battle of Muktsar, the army of Guru Gobind Singh camped at Sabo Ki Talwandi. This acted as a damdamā, or halting place (lit. "breathing place"), and is now the site of Takht Sri Damdamā Sahib. That year, Guru Gobind Singh is said to have founded a distinguished school of exegesis, later headed up by Baba Deep Singh. Guru Gobind Singh reestablished the famous Anandpur Darbar of learning in Damdamā Sahib, as now this new location was considered to be the highest seat of learning for the Sikhs during the 18th century. Modern Damdami Taksal (Jatha Bhindran-Mehta) claims direct historical ties to Guru Gobind Singh, who entrusted them with the responsibility of teaching the reading (santhyā), analysis (vichār/vidya) and recitation of the Sikh scriptures (santhya). The word ṭaksāl (lit. 'mint') refers to an education institute; which is a community of students who associate themselves with a particular sant (lit. spiritual leader or saint).

The main center of the present-day Damdami Taksal (Jatha Bhindran-Mehta) is located at Gurdwārā Gurdarshan Parkāsh in Mehta, Amritsar. People debate whether or not the current Taksal can trace its lineage back to the first jathedar (president), Baba Deep Singh. During the time of the British Raj over India, Damdami Taksal went gupt (into hiding) and as such, official records & lineages are difficult to pinpoint.

Damdami Taksal (Jatha Bhindran-Mehta) achieved prominence again through its second incumbent, Gurbachan Singh Khalsa (1902-1969) of Bhindran Kalan, hence its name. He devoted his entire life to teaching the meaning (vidya) and pronunciation (santhya) while reciting the Sikh scriptures. He trained a large number of gianīs (traditional Sikh scholars) through his mobile seminary. When he died in 1969, he was succeeded by two contenders, Giani Mohan Singh (1919-2020), leading the original in Ludhiana, and Kartar Singh (1932-1977), leading from Mehtā in Amritsar district. It is said that Gurbachan Singh Khalsa chose Kartar Singh, but his family chose the older Giani Mohan Singh. The Damdami Taksal (Jatha Bhindran-Mehta) also had a history of dispute with the Indian government, as a previous leader, Kartar Singh Khalsa, had been a severe critic of the excesses of Indira Gandhi’s Emergency rule. Jarnail Singh Bhindranwale was the last jathedar (president) of Damdami Taksal (Jatha Bhindran-Mehta). Jarnail Singh Bhindranwale was a famous religious scholar who led this renounced sect of Sikhs, and also became a famous militant who got into conflict with the Indian Government.

Early Heretical/Syncretic Sects

Minas

The Mina sect followed Baba Prithi Chand (1558–1618), the eldest son of Guru Ram Das after the younger brother Guru Arjan was officially made the next Guru. Called Minas by the orthodox Sikhs, a derogatory term meaning "scoundrels", An alternate non-derogatory term for them has been the Miharvan Sikhs, after the son of Prithi Chand. This sect was shunned by orthodox Sikhs, declared by Guru Gobind Singh as one of the five Panj Mel that a Sikh must avoid.

They emerged in a period of religious persecution and inner dispute within the Sikh tradition during the 17th-century on the appropriateness of violence and non-violence in the pursuit of religious freedoms and spiritual matters. According to Hardip Syan and Pritam Singh, Miharvans emphasized more of the non-militant approach of Guru Nanak and earlier Gurus in theological pursuits, while the Guru Hargobind followers pursued the "miri-piri" approach and began militarizing the Sikh tradition to resist the Mughal persecution. The Minas controlled Amritsar and Harmandir Sahib built under Guru Arjan for much of the 17th-century.

The Minas faded in the eighteenth century and are now extinct.

Hindalis

A lesser Sikh sect contemporary to the Minas was the obscure Hindalis (Gurmukhi: ਹਿੰਦਾਲੀਏ; hidālī'ē), or Niranjanis (Gurmukhi: ਨਿਰੰਜਨੀਏ; nirajanī'ē), who followed Bidhi Chand of Jandiala (Gurmukhi: ਜੰਡਿਆਲਾ ਦੇ ਬਿਧੀ ਚੰਦ; distinct from Bidhi Chand Chhina), son of Hindal (Gurmukhi: ਹਿੰਦਾਲ or ਹੰਦਾਲ), a resident of Amritsar who became a Sikh during Guru Amar Das' reign, who would follow his father's path, becoming a chief official at a Sikh temple in the town of Jandiala Guru in Amritsar. He would lose his congregation after marrying a Muslim woman however, and so would establish a new panth in an effort to undermine Guru Hargobind, propagating his father Hindal to be superior to Guru Nanak, who was relegated to being simply a follower of Kabir. They would not impact Sikh society the way as the Minas did, leaving little behind besides a janamsakhi tradition and attempts to link their tradition to Bhai Bala, a Sandhu Jatt, as they were a Jatt-led sect. Despite the majority of the Sikh panth being Jatt, the Hindalis did not draw a large following. The Hindalis, compared to the Minas, produced a modest volume of literary contribution. The competing works of the Minas and Hindalis provide insight into early Sikh society and thought.

Ramraiyas

Ram Raiyas were a sect of Sikhism who followed Ram Rai, the eldest son of Guru Har Rai. He was sent by his father as an emissary to the Mughal emperor Aurangzeb in Delhi. Aurangzeb objected to a verse in the Sikh scripture (Asa ki Var) that stated, "the clay from a Musalman's grave is kneaded into potter's lump", considering it an insult to Islam. Ram Rai explained that the text was miscopied and modified it, substituting "Musalman" with "Beiman" (faithless, evil) which Aurangzeb approved. The willingness to change a word led Guru Har Rai to bar his son from his presence. Aurangzeb responded by granting Ram Rai a jagir (land grant) in Garhwal region (Uttarakhand). The town later came to be known as Dehradun, after Dehra referring to Ram Rai's shrine. Many Sikhs settled with Ram Rai, they followed Guru Nanak, but orthodox Sikhs have shunned them. They were one of the Panj Mel, the five reprobate groups that orthodox Sikhs are expected to shun with contempt. The other four are the Minas, the Masands, the Dhirmalias, the Sir-gums (those Sikhs who accept Amrit baptism but subsequently cut their hair). Very few exist today.

Nanakpanthi

A Nanakpanthi is a follower of the teachings of Guru Nanak, the first guru of Sikhism. The community transcends the boundaries of Sikhism and Hinduism, and was also a reference to the early Sikh community.  Most Sindhi Hindu people are Nanakpanthi, and during the 1881 and 1891 censuses, the community could not decide whether to self-identify as Hindu or Sikh. In 1911, Shahpur District (Punjab) reported 12,539 Hindus (20% of the total Hindu population) identifying themselves as Nanakpanthi, in addition to 9,016 Sikhs (22% of the total Sikh population). The institutional focus of Nanakpanthi social life was around a dharamsala, playing the same role before the 20th century as the Gurdwara has played thereafter under Khalsa dominated period. The beliefs and practices of the Nanakpanthis overlapped with those of Sahajdhari and Udasi Sikhs in pre-20th century period, as evidenced by documents dated to that period. In 1891 Census of British India, which was the first to categorize Sikhs into sects, 579,000 people identified themselves as "Hindu Nanakpanthi" and another 297,000 as "Sikh Nanakpanthi". The other major Sikh categories were Sikh Kesdhari and Gobind Singhi Sikhs in this census. Many Muslims also consider themselves as Nanakpanthis.

Later Sikh Sampardas & Sects

Tat Khalsa 

The Tat Khalsa (Gurmukhi: ਤੱਤ ਖਾਲਸਾ, translit. Tata khālasā), also romanised as Tatt Khalsa, known as the Akal Purkhias during the 18th century, was a Sikh faction that arose from the schism following the passing of Guru Gobind Singh in 1708, led by his widow Mata Sundari, opposed to the religious innovations of Banda Singh Bahadur and his followers. It is regarded as the orthodox and orthoprax sect of Sikhism.

Bandai Khalsa 

The Bandais were those who believed Banda Singh Bahadur was the spiritual successor of Guru Gobind Singh. They were excommunicated from mainstream Sikhism by the Tat Khalsa faction in 1721. Only a few exist now in the present-day.

Namdharis

Namdharis, also known as Kuka Sikhs, believe that the line of Sikh Gurus did not end with Guru Gobind Singh, as they claim that he did not die in Nanded but escaped and lived in secret, and that he nominated Balak Singh to be the 11th Guru, a tradition that was continued through the Namdhari leaders. They did not believe in any religious ritual other than the repetition of God's name (or nam, for which reason members of the sect are called Namdharis), including the worship of idols, graves, tombs, gods, or goddesses. The Namdharis had more of a social impact due to the fact that they emphasized Khalsa identity and the authority of the Guru Granth Sahib. They call their houses of worship dharamsalas.

Their 12th guru was Ram Singh, who moved the sect's center to Bhaini Sahib (Ludhiana). A Tarkhan or Ramgharia, his rural sect would be composed largely of Ramgharias and poorer Jat Sikhs. They have been strictly vegetarian and a strong opponent of cattle slaughter, and retaliated against Muslims for killing cows in 1872. Their leader Ram Singh was arrested by the British and he was exiled to Rangoon, Myanmar. Dozens of Namdharis were arrested by the British and executed without trial in Ludhiana and Ambala. They consider Guru Granth Sahib and Dasam Granth as equally important, and compositions from the Chandi di Var are a part of their daily Nitnem. Like Hindus, they circumambulate the fire (havan) during their weddings, but they differ in that the hymns are those from the Adi Granth.

The Namdharis wear homespun white turbans, which they wrap around their heads (sidhi pagri). They are called Kuka, which means "crier, shouter", for their ecstatic religious practices during devotional singing. They also meditate, using mala (rosary). Some texts refer to them as Jagiasi or Abhiasi.

Nirankari

The Nirankari movement was founded by Baba Dyal Das (1783–1855), as a Sikh reform movement in northwestern Punjab around the middle of 19th century, in the later part of Ranjit Singh's reign. Nirankari means "without form", and reflects their belief that God cannot be represented in any form and that true Sikh faith is based on nam simaran. Among the earliest Sikh reform movements, the Nirankaris condemned the growing idol worship, obeisance to living gurus and influence of Brahmanic ritual that had crept into the Sikh panth. Though not an initiated Khalsa, he urged Sikhs to return to their focus to a formless divine (nirankar) and described himself as a nirankari. Maharaja Ranjit Singh of the Sikh Empire was said to have appreciated his teachings.

Nirankari have opposed any form of ritualism in Sikhism, emphasizing the need to return to the teachings of their founder Guru Nanak. They were the first sect to demand major changes in how Sikh temples are operated, the Sikh ceremonies. They also disagreed with the orthodox Sikhs on only 10 Gurus and the scripture as the living Guru. Nirankaris believe that human guru to interpret the scripture and guide Sikhs is a necessity. Nirankaris are indistinguishable from other Sikhs in outward appearance, with both kesdhari ("hair-keeping") and sahajdhari ("slow-adopter") followers; their acceptance of the mainstream Sikh marriage settled the main issue dividing them from the orthodox Sikhs, leaving only their recognition of a continuing line of Gurus from Baba Dyal as the main differentiation.

The Sant Nirankaris are a small group which splintered from the Nirankaris in the 1940s, and is opposed by orthodox Sikhs and Nirankaris alike. They believe that scripture is open and therefore added works of their leaders into the Guru Granth Sahib. This led to increasingly conflicts with the orthodox Sikhs, with whom the Sant Nirankaris had clashed since the 1950s, with tensions increasing due to some of Gurbachan Singh's religious actions, culminating in the 1978 Sikh-Nirankari clashes and further incidents. In late 1970s, Jarnail Singh Bhindranwale repeatedly denounced their practices. In 1980, the leader of Sant Nirankari tradition, Gurbachan Singh, was assassinated.

Radha Soami

The Meaning of Radha Soami is Lord Of The Soul. This movement was started by Shiv Dayal Singh (also known as Soamiji) in 1861, follower of Guru Nanak and Tulsi sahib of Hathras. The Radhasoamis are like sect of Sikhism, as it does have connections with Sikhism, and the teachings of their founder were based, in part, on those of the founder of Sikhism, Guru Nanak and those who followed. They consider themselves a separate religion. Many recite verses from the Adi Granth during their worship, though few would call themselves a Sikh sect, as there are no ties between it and orthodox Sikh organizations, and most Sikhs would also regard the idea of Radhasoami as separate from their own. However, they are also different from the Sikhs because they have present-day Gurus, and do not follow the Khalsa dress code.

The Radhasoamis are a religious fellowship that accepts saints and living gurus from anywhere. According to its founder, "image worship, pilgrimages or idol worship" is a "waste of time," "ceremonies and religious rituals are a conceit," and all traditional religious technicians, "the Rishis, Yogis, Brahmans, and Sannyasins," have "failed," while its leaders, while believing in karma, have been emphatic in rejecting other often cardinal Hindu beliefs and in their suspicion of institutions, leading a 19th-century leader to assert its independent basis from Hinduism "or any other religion," often choosing to avoid the word "religion" altogether, with a leader describing it as "no religion at all," but an amalgamation of "the teachings of ... all saints of the world." It has attracted a large number of Dalits, and in the diaspora have attracted may members of other ethnic groups for which the satsang is conducted in English.

Like the writings of Sikh gurus, Shiv Dayal used the epithet satnam for the divine. The Radhasoamis do not install the any other scriptures in their sanctum. Instead, the guru sits in the sanctum while conducting the satsang  and they listen to explanation of sayings of various saints, from the Adi Granth or the living guru, as well as sing hymns together. The Radha Soamis are strict vegetarians like some Sikhs. They are active in charitable work such as providing free medical services and help to the needy.

Ridváni 

The Ridváni Sikh Fellowship was founded in Mumbai in the year 1908 by Prof. Pritam Singh, who was the first Sikh to profess faith in Baháʼu'lláh, founder of the Baháʼí Faith. The name Ridváni is derived from the Baha'i festival of Ridván. The Ridvanis view the Báb and Baháʼu'lláh as the Mahdi and the Kalki avatar respectively, as the Dasam Granth notes they had yet to arrive by the time of Guru Gobind Singh. Ridvánis keep the panj kakkars, adhere to the Rehat Maryada, and read the Guru Granth Sahib, while also following the commands of the Kitáb-i-Aqdas including Baha'i prayer and meditation, giving 19% of one's disposable income in kind, and social ordinances like burial customs. Ridvani Sikhs celebrate all traditional Sikh and Baha'i holidays, as well as astrological holidays such as Sankranti, Muslim holidays such as Qadr Night and Eid al-Adha, and the Christian holidays of Fasika, Pentecost and Halloween. While most Ridvánis live in India, a significant diaspora exists in North America and historically in Baghdad.

3HO 

The 3HO sect (abbreviation for 'Healthy, Happy, Holy Organization') is a western group that emerged in 1971, founded by Harbhajan Singh, popularly known as Yogi Bhajan. It requires both men and women to wear turbans, and adopt the surname Khalsa. They also call themselves the "Sikh Dharma movement" and "Khalsa Dharma movement" and are often called Gora (meaning "white person", though not all White Sikhs follow 3HO) Sikhs and Bhajanists by the mainstream adherents of Sikhism. Their name 3HO, stands for Healthy Happy Holy Organization. This Sikh sect emphasizes meditation and Yoga. The sect started and grew a number of international business brands such as Yogi Tea. 3HO's relations with the orthodox Khalsa are quite mixed. The 3HO sect has a strict rahit, the code of conduct expectation.

Split traditions

This section deals with split traditions or former Sikh sects which no-longer self-identify as such. Two contemporary Indian religions, Ravidassia and Bhaniara Dera, began as sects of the Sikh religion, but no longer identify as part of Sikhism. In both cases, their separation from Sikhism was marked by the adoption of a new religious scripture to replace the Guru Granth Sahib.

Ravidassia

The Ravidasi Panth used to be a part of Sikhism. In 2009, the sect left Sikhism and gained recognition as a separate tradition. It is based on the teachings of the 14th century Indian guru Ravidas, revered as a satguru. The movement had attracted dalits (formerly marginalised), and they felt that they were a victim of social discrimination and violence from government Sikhs.

Historically, Ravidassia represented a range of beliefs in the Indian subcontinent, with some devotees of Ravidass counting themselves as Ravidassia Sikhs, but first formed in the early 20th-century in colonial British India. The Ravidassia community began to take on more cohesion following 1947, and the establishment of successful Ravidassia communities in the diaspora.

Ravidassias, states Ronki Ram, accept contemporary living sants of Ravidass Deras as Guru whereas the Sikhs do not. In 2009, Many of the government people went to attack by pretending to be Sikhs violently attacked the living guru, his deputy and followers at a Ravidassia gurdwara (temple) in Vienna. This assassination attempt injured many and killed the deputy Ramanand Dass. This triggered the Ravidasi Sikhs to leave Sikhism and become an independent religion fully separated from Sikhism.

Prior to their break from Sikhism, the Dera Bhallan revered and recited the Guru Granth Sahib of Sikhism in Dera Bhallan. However, following their split from mainstream Sikhism, the Dera Bhallan compiled their own holy book based exclusively on Ravidas's teachings, the Amritbani Guru Ravidass Ji, and these Dera Bhallan Ravidassia temples now use this book in place of the Guru Granth Sahib.

Bhaniara Dera 
A breakaway sect founded by Piara Singh Bhaniara, who claimed to be an incarnation of Guru Gobind Singh, in the 1980's based in Dhamiana village in Ropar. Most of its followers drew from the Dalit community, known as Mazhabi Sikhs. In 2001, a scripture was published by the group named Bhavsagar Samunder Amrit Vani Granth (commonly shortened to simply Bhavsagar Granth), which was later banned by the Government of Punjab for hurting the religious feelings of Sikhs.

See also
 Dera (organization)
 Guru-shishya parampara
 Sampradaya
 Sant Mat
 Contemporary Sant Mat movements
 Bhakti movement

References